Hoar Cross is a small village and civil parish in the Borough of East Staffordshire, situated approximately  west of Burton upon Trent.

History
Hoarcross, as it was then called, was enclosed like the nearby Chartley Park from Needwood Forest.  Unlike Chartley Park, Hoarcross survived without significant development.  Today it is surrounded by agricultural land, still nestled in the hills of the ancient Needwood Forest (now part of the National Forest) but now become a notably affluent part of the East Staffordshire borough.

The eight extensive ornate partitioned gardens of Hoar Cross Hall once rivalled those of nearby Trentham, and maintained an extensive staff of gardeners in the early decades of the 20th century.

The Church

The Anglican parish church of Hoar Cross is Holy Angels' Church, in the Diocese of Lichfield. It was built by the pious Anglo-Catholic, Emily Charlotte Meynall-Ingram (sister of Charles Wood, 2nd Viscount Halifax) as a memorial to her late husband Hugo Francis Meynell Ingram. The church - an extremely elaborate edifice - was designed by George Frederick Bodley and Thomas Garner. One of its more famous features is a highly elaborate set of Stations of the Cross. Since 2008, it has received AEO from the Bishop of Ebbsfleet.

See also
Listed buildings in Hoar Cross

References

External links

Villages in Staffordshire
Borough of East Staffordshire